The Academy of Comic Book Arts (ACBA) was an American professional organization of the 1970s that was designed to be the comic book industry analog of such groups as the Academy of Motion Picture Arts and Sciences. Composed of comic-book professionals and initially formed as an honorary society focused on discussing the comic-book craft and hosting an annual awards banquet, the ACBA evolved into an advocacy organization focused on creators' rights.

The ACBA award, the Shazam, was a statuette in the shape of a lightning bolt. In addition to the creative awards, the ACBA also established the Academy of Comic Book Arts Hall of Fame award, inducting Superman creators Jerry Siegel and Joe Shuster as its initial honorees.

History
Founded in 1970, the ACBA's first president was Stan Lee; its first vice-president was Dick Giordano (presidents initially served one-year terms). The ACBA met monthly at the Manhattan headquarters of the Society of Illustrators.

The Academy's Shazam Award was a successor to the 1960s Alley Award; the ACBA held its first annual awards banquet at the Statler Hilton Hotel's Terrace Ballroom on May 12, 1971.

Aside from its Shazam Awards, the ACBA also published an annual fundraiser sketchbook. Contributing to the 36-page ACBA Sketchbook 1973 were Neal Adams, Sergio Aragones, Frank Brunner, Howard Chaykin, Dave Cockrum, Reed Crandall, Frank Frazetta, Michael Kaluta, Gil Kane, Gray Morrow, John Romita Sr., Mike Royer, Syd Shores, Jim Starlin, Jim Steranko, Herb Trimpe, and Wally Wood. The 48-page ACBA Sketchbook 1975 included Adams, Aragones, Chaykin, Kaluta, Kane, Romita Sr., Steranko, Wood, and John Byrne, Russ Heath, Jeff Jones, Harvey Kurtzman, Walt Simonson, Michael Whelan, and Berni Wrightson. Wood also contributed to the 1976 and 1977 sketchbooks.

Under its later president, artist Neal Adams, the ACBA became an advocacy organization for creators' rights. The comic-book industry at that time typically did not return artists' physical artwork after shooting the requisite film for printing, and in some cases destroyed the artwork to prevent unauthorized reprints. The industry also did not then offer royalties or residuals, common in such creative fields as book publishing, film and television, and the recording industry.

Historian Jon B. Cooke writes:

Adams wanted to focus on creator rights and pay rates, essentially making the ACBA a labor union. In a 1998 interview, Lee said, "ACBA became divided into two camps, it seemed. I wasn't interested in starting a union, so I walked away from it."

During 1970-1974, the ACBA Newsletter, varying in page count from 4-12 pages, was published by ACBA themselves on a roughly bi-monthly basis, subscriptions available to any interested party. The last known [from this writer] issue was #29, 1974.

Once the ACBA — riding a wave begun by the mid-'70s independent startup Atlas/Seaboard Comics, which instituted royalties and the return of artwork in order to attract creators — helped see those immediate goals achieved, it then gradually disbanded.

As writer Steven Grant notes, by 1977 the ACBA had "... disintegrated into what became Adams' "First Friday" professional get-togethers at his studio or apartment."

Irene Vartanoff was the final ACBA treasurer. In early 2005, approximately $3,000 in sketchbook sales plus general contributions to the ACBA and accumulated interest was donated from the ACBA's Bill Everett Fund — created in 1975 to help comics professionals in financial need — to The Hero Initiative (formerly known as A Commitment to Our Roots, or ACTOR), a federally chartered, not-for-profit corporation likewise dedicated.

Legacy 
The ACBA was the first in a string of largely unsuccessful comics-industry organizations that includes the Comic Book Creators Guild (1978–1979), the Comic Book Professionals Association (CBPA, 1992–1994), and Comic Artists, Retailers and Publishers (CARP, 1998). The long-running exception had been the publishers' group the Comics Magazine Association of America (CMAA), founded in 1954 and lasting through 2011, as a response to public pressure and a Senate subcommittee on juvenile delinquency, and which created the self-censorship board the Comics Code Authority.

Grant summed up the ABCA's legacy this way:

Shazam Awards

The Shazam Awards were a series of awards given between 1970 and 1975 for outstanding achievement in the comic book field. Awards were given in the year following publication of the material (at a dinner ceremony modeled on the National Cartoonist Society's Reuben Award dinners). The Shazam Awards were based on nominations and were the first comics awards voted upon by industry professionals. The name of the award is that of the magic word used by the original Captain Marvel, a popular superhero of the 1940s and early 1950s.

Marvel's comic-book Secret Wars II #1 (1985) features a fictional scriptwriter, Stewart Cadwall (based on real-life writer Steve Gerber) who has a Shazam Award on his table. When Cadwall becomes a superhuman, his Shazam Award turns into a weapon. Cadwall and his Shazam Award re-appeared in Iron Man #197 (1985).

1970
 Winners. Presented May 12, 1971.

 Best Letterer: Sam Rosen (Marvel Comics)
 Best Colorist: Jack Adler (DC Comics)
 Best Story: "No Evil Shall Escape My Sight" by Dennis O'Neil & Neal Adams, Green Lantern/Green Arrow #76 (DC Comics)
 Outstanding Achievement by an Individual: Jim Steranko (for book The Steranko History of Comics)
 Best Foreign Title: Legionarios del Espacio (writer-artist Esteban Maroto, Spain)
 Best New Talent: Barry Smith (Marvel Comics)
 Best Humor Inker: Henry Scarpelli (DC Comics)
 Best Humor Penciller: Bob Oksner (DC Comics)
 Best Humor Writer: Carl Barks, Junior Woodchucks (Gold Key Comics)
 Best Continuing Feature: Green Lantern/Green Arrow (DC Comics)
 Special Recognition outside the Field: Nostalgia Press (for comic strip reprints)
 Best Drama Inker: Dick Giordano
 Best Drama Penciller: Neal Adams
 Best Drama Writer: Dennis O'Neil
 Hall of Fame: Jerry Siegel & Joe Shuster
 Special Plaque: Stan Lee ("for forming ACBA")

1971
 Winners. Presented 1972.

 Best Continuing Feature: Conan the Barbarian (Marvel)
 Best Individual Story: "Snowbirds Don't Fly" by Dennis O'Neil & Neal Adams, Green Lantern/Green Arrow #85 (DC)
 Best Writer (Dramatic Division): Roy Thomas
 Best Penciller (Dramatic Division): Neal Adams
 Best Inker (Dramatic Division): Dick Giordano
 Best Writer (Humor Division): John Albano
 Best Penciller (Humor Division): Dan DeCarlo
 Best Inker (Humor Division): Henry Scarpelli
 Best Letterer: Gaspar Saladino
 Best Colorist: Tatjana Wood
 Best Foreign Artist: Frank Bellamy
 Outstanding New Talent: (tie) Michael Kaluta, Richard Corben
 Special Recognition: Gil Kane, "for Blackmark, his paperback comics novel"
 Special Achievement by an Individual: Jack Kirby, "for his Fourth World series in Forever People, New Gods, Mister Miracle, Superman's Pal Jimmy Olsen"
 Hall of Fame: Will Eisner

1972
 Winners. Presented 1973.

 Best Continuing Feature: n.a.
 Best Individual Story (Dramatic): "Dark Genesis" by Len Wein & Berni Wrightson, Swamp Thing #1 (DC). 
Also nominated: "The Black Hound of Vengeance," by Roy Thomas & Barry Smith, Conan the Barbarian #20 (Marvel)
 Best Individual Short Story (Dramatic): "The Demon Within" by John Albano & Jim Aparo, House of Mystery #201 (DC)
 Best Writer (Dramatic Division): Len Wein, Swamp Thing
 Best Penciller (Dramatic Division): Berni Wrightson, Swamp Thing
 Best Inker (Dramatic Division): n.a.
 Best Humor Story: "The Poster Plague" by Steve Skeates & Sergio Aragones, House of Mystery #202 (DC)
 Best Writer (Humor Division):  n.a.
 Best Penciller (Humor Division):  n.a.
 Best Inker (Humor Division): Sergio Aragones, Mad
 Best Letterer: n.a.
 Best Colorist: n.a.
 Best Foreign Artist: n.a.
 Outstanding New Talent: n.a.
 Special Award: DC letterer/proofreader Gerda Gattel "for bringing her special warmth to our history"
 Superior Achievement by an Individual: Julius Schwartz "for bringing the Shazam Family back into print"
 Hall of Fame:  n.a.

1973
 Nominees where known, and winners. Presented 1974.

 Best Continuing Feature: Swamp Thing (DC)
Also nominated: Conan the Barbarian (Marvel), The Tomb of Dracula (Marvel)
 Best Individual Story (Dramatic): "Song of Red Sonja" by Roy Thomas & Barry Smith, Conan the Barbarian #24 (Marvel)
Also nominated: "A Clockwork Horror" by Len Wein & Berni Wrightson, Swamp Thing #6 (DC); "Finally, Shuma-Gorath" by Steve Englehart & Frank Brunner Marvel Premiere #10 (Marvel)
 Best Individual Short Story (Dramatic): "The Himalayan Incident" (Manhunter) by Archie Goodwin & Walt Simonson, Detective Comics #437 (DC)
 Best Writer (Dramatic Division): Archie Goodwin (Manhunter in Detective Comics #437-443)
Also nominated: Roy Thomas (Conan the Barbarian); Len Wein (Swamp Thing)
 Best Penciller (Dramatic Division): Berni Wrightson (Swamp Thing)
Also nominated: John Buscema (Conan the Barbarian, The Savage Sword of Conan); Mike Ploog (Marvel Spotlight, Frankenstein)
 Best Inker (Dramatic Division): Dick Giordano (Justice League of America)
Also nominated: Tom Palmer (The Tomb of Dracula); Berni Wrightson (Swamp Thing)
 Best Humor Story: "The Gourmet", Plop! #1 (DC)
Also nominated: "The Escape", Plop! #1; "F-f-frongs", Spoof #3 (Marvel); "Kung Fooey", Crazy #1 (Marvel)
 Best Writer (Humor Division): (tie) Stu Schwartzberg; Steve Skeates
Also nominated: Roy Thomas, Marv Wolfman
 Best Penciller (Humor Division): Marie Severin (Crazy)
Also nominated: Bob Foster (Crazy); Larry Hama (Crazy); Mike Ploog (Crazy)
 Best Inker (Humor Division): Ralph Reese
Also nominated: Russ Heath; John Severin; Herb Trimpe
 Best Letterer: Gaspar Saladino
 Best Colorist: Glynis Wein
 Best Foreign Comic Series: Lieutenant Blueberry
 Outstanding New Talent: (tie) Walt Simonson; Jim Starlin
Also nominated: Klaus Janson
 Superior Achievement by an Individual: Richard Corben
 Hall of Fame: Carl Barks

1974
 Nominees and winners. Presented 1975.

 Best Continuing Feature: Conan the Barbarian (Marvel)
Also nominated: Man-Thing (Marvel), The Tomb of Dracula (Marvel)
 Best Individual Story (Dramatic): "Götterdämmerung" by Archie Goodwin & Walt Simonson, Detective Comics #443 (DC)
Also nominated: "Night of the Stalker" by Sal Amendola with Vin Amendola, Steve Englehart, and Dick Giordano, Detective Comics #439 (DC); "Red Nails" by Roy Thomas & Barry Smith, Savage Tales #1-3 (Marvel)
 Best Individual Short Story (Dramatic): "Cathedral Perilous" (Manhunter) by Archie Goodwin & Walt Simonson, Detective Comics #441 (DC)
Also nominated: "Burma Sky," by Archie Goodwin & Alex Toth, Our Fighting Forces #146 (DC); "Jenifer" by Bruce Jones & Berni Wrightson, Creepy #63 (Warren)
 Best Writer (Dramatic Division): Archie Goodwin
Also nominated: Steve Gerber, Roy Thomas
 Best Penciller (Dramatic Division): John Buscema
Also nominated: Gene Colan, Berni Wrightson
 Best Inker (Dramatic Division): Dick Giordano
Also nominated: Frank Giacoia; Tom Palmer; Joe Sinnott
 Best Humor Story: "Kaspar the Dead Baby" by Marv Wolfman & Marie Severin Crazy #8 (Marvel)
Also nominated: "The Boob Rube Story" by Stu Schwartzberg & Marie Severin, Crazy #4; "The Ecchorcist" by Marv Wolfman & Vance Rodewalt (Crazy #6); "Police Gory Story" by Stu Schwartzberg & Vance Rodewalt (Crazy #8)
 Best Writer (Humor Division): Steve Skeates
Also nominated: Nick Cuti; Steve Gerber; Joe Gill
 Best Penciller (Humor Division): Marie Severin
Also nominated: Dan DeCarlo; Frank Roberge; George Wildman
 Best Inker (Humor Division): Ralph Reese
Also nominated: Rudy Lapick; Frank Roberge; Marie Severin; George Wildman
 Best Letterer: John Costanza
Also nominated: Annette Kawecki; Gaspar Saladino; Artie Simek
 Best Colorist: Tatjana Wood
Also nominated: Marie Severin; Glynis Wein
 Outstanding New Talent: Craig Russell
Also nominated: Paul Gulacy; Al Milgrom
 Superior Achievement by an Individual: Roy Thomas
Also nominated: Barry Smith; Jim Starlin
 Hall of Fame: Jack Kirby
Also nominated: Alex Toth; Wally Wood

Additional credits where not given in cited source:

See also
Academy of Comic-Book Fans and Collectors
Creator ownership
Alley Award
Bill Finger Award
Eagle Awards
Eisner Award
Harvey Award
Inkpot Award
Kirby Award
National Comics Award
Russ Manning Award

References

External links
 Bridwell, E. Nelson,  "Siegel, Shuster & Superman", Amazing World of DC Comics: Special Edition #1 (Feb. 1976)
 Additional .

Comics-related organizations
1970 establishments in the United States
1977 disestablishments in the United States